Modern Beauty or Modern Lady is a 26-episode 2007 Chinese language television series produced by Starlight International Media starring Kristy Yeung, Wallace Huo, Wang Xiyi, Li Xuan and Yu Xiaowei.

Main cast
 Kristy Yeung as Lin Ziqi
 Wallace Huo as Yang Guang
 Yu Xiaowei as Xiao Jie
 Yvonne Yung (Weng Hong) as Wang Hui
 Li Xuan as Zhu Yun
 Wang Xiyi as Xia Yuhan

Plot Overview
The story revolves around the struggles of three modern ladies Kristy Yeung, Wang Xi Yi and Li Xuan as they explore life and romance in the bustling city of Shanghai. Actors Wallace Huo, Yu Xiao Wei and Lu Jie Jun are the "men" in these three ladies' hearts.

References

External links
 Official Site - Sina

2007 Chinese television series debuts
Chinese romance television series
Mandarin-language television shows